The Symphony for Organ No. 5 in F minor, Op. 42, No. 1, was composed by Charles-Marie Widor in 1879, with numerous revisions published by the composer in later years. The full symphony lasts for about 35 minutes.

Structure
The piece consists of five movements:
 Allegro vivace
 Allegro cantabile
 Andantino quasi allegretto
 Adagio
 Toccata

Final movement
The fifth movement, in F major, is often referred to as just Widor's Toccata because it is his most famous piece. It lasts around six minutes. Its fame in part comes from its frequent use as recessional music at festive Christmas and wedding ceremonies.

The melody of Widor's Toccata is based upon an arrangement of rapid staccato arpeggios which form phrases, initially in F, moving in fifths through to C major, G major, etc. Each phrase consists of one bar. The melody is complemented by syncopated chords, forming an accented rhythm against the perpetual arpeggio motif. The phrases are contextualised by a descending bass line, often beginning with the 7th tone of each phrase key. For example, where the phrase consists of an arpeggio in C major, the bass line begins with a B. The arpeggios eventually modulate through all twelve keys, until Widor brings the symphony to a close with  block chords in the final three bars.

Following Widor's example, other composers adopted this style of toccata as a popular genre in French Romantic organ music, including notable examples from Eugène Gigout, Léon Boëllmann, Louis Vierne, Henri Mulet, and Marcel Dupré.

Usage at royal weddings

Denmark
 Princess Margrethe and Henri de Laborde de Monpezat on 10 June 1967 at the  Church of Holmen
 Prince Joachim and Alexandra Christina Manley on 18 November 1995  at Frederiksborg Palace Church
 Prince Frederick and Mary Donaldson on 14 May 2004 at Copenhagen Cathedral

Britain
 The Princess Margaret and Antony Armstrong-Jones on 6 May 1960 at Westminster Abbey
 The Duke of Kent and Katharine Worsley on 8 June 1961 at York Minster
 Princess Alexandra of Kent and Angus Ogilvy on 24 April 1963 at Westminster Abbey
 The Princess Anne and Captain Mark Phillips on 14 November 1973 at Westminster Abbey 
 The Prince Edward and Sophie Rhys-Jones on 19 June 1999 at St George's Chapel, Windsor Castle
 Prince William of Wales and Catherine Middleton on 29 April 2011 at Westminster Abbey

Norway
 Princess Märtha Louise and Ari Behn on 24 May 2002 at Nidaros Cathedral

Notable recordings

Video
 Performed by Frederick Hohman at the Cathedral Basilica of the Sacred Heart (Newark, New Jersey)
 Performed by the composer at the Église Saint-Sulpice, Paris
Performed by Kalevi Kiviniemi at the Saint-Ouen Abbey, Rouen

Audio
 Conclusion of the First Movement played by Marcel Dupré on the Alexandra Palace organ, 7 March 1930 (direct link to MP3 file).
 Produced for the RollerCoaster Tycoon video game series by British video game musician Allister Brimble and performed by Peter James Adcock (link to YouTube video).

References

External links
 
 Soul Music - Radio 4 programme in March 2006

Compositions by Charles-Marie Widor
1879 compositions
Compositions for organ
Widor
Compositions in F minor